Los Banos can refer to
 Los Banos, California, a city in the San Joaquin Valley of California.
 Los Baños, Laguna, a city in the Philippines.